Olepa clavatus is a moth of the family Erebidae first described by Charles Swinhoe in 1885. It is found in India.

References

Spilosomina
Moths described in 1885